Kiltegan is a village in west County Wicklow, Ireland, on the R747 regional road close to the border with County Carlow.

The 19th century mansion Humewood House lies just outside the village. It was built in 1870 for William Hume-Dick, father-in-law of Richard Penruddocke Long, by William White. It remained in the Hume family until the death of Mimi Weygand (née Hume), in 1992.
The house has been used as a location for films such as "The Actors" starring Michael Caine, "Ella Enchanted" with Joanna Lumley, "Laws of Attraction" starring Pierce Brosnan and Julianne Moore, and for ABC's television movie, "Prince William".

The Roman Catholic St Patrick's Missionary Society, known as the Kiltegan Fathers, has its mother house at High Park 2 km from the village.

Kiltegan won the Irish Tidy Towns Competition in 1973. The village is also home to Kiltegan GAA club, which also includes players from the nearby sister village of Rathdangan.

Notable people
 
 
J. P. Dalton (born 1984), Gaelic footballer

See also
List of towns and villages in Ireland

References

External links

 Church of Ireland, Kiltegan
 St.Patrick's Missionary Society/Kiltegan Fathers
 The Tidy Towns of Ireland "Celebrating 50 years"

Towns and villages in County Wicklow